The Colloncuran age is a period of geologic time (15.5–13.8 Ma) within the Middle Miocene epoch of the Neogene, used more specifically within the SALMA classification in South America. It follows the Friasian and precedes the Laventan age.

Etymology 
The age is named after the Collón Curá Formation in the Cañadón Asfalto and Neuquén Basins of northern Patagonia, Argentina.

Formations

Fossils

References

Bibliography 
Collón Curá Formation
 
 
 
 
 
 
 
 
 
 
 
 
 
 
 
 
 
 
 
 
 
 
 
 
 
 
 

Castilletes Formation
 
 
 
 
 
 
 
 

Cura-Mallín Group
 
 
 

Gran Bajo del Gualicho Formation
 

Nazareno Formation
 
 
 
 

Pebas Formation
 
 

Pisco Formation
 
 
 
 
 
 
 
 
 
 
 
 
 
 

 
Miocene South America
Neogene Argentina
.
Mapuche language